The yellow anaconda (Eunectes notaeus), also known as the Paraguayan anaconda, is a boa species endemic to southern South America. It is one of the largest snakes in the world but smaller than its close relative, the green anaconda. No subspecies are currently recognized. Like all boas and pythons, it is non-venomous and kills its prey by constriction.

Etymology

In distinguishing his new species Eunectes notaeus from Eunectes murinus, Edward Drinker Cope stated, "Dorsal scales are larger and in fewer rows."

Description

They commonly weigh , but specimens weighing more than  have been observed. The color pattern consists of a yellow, golden-tan or greenish-yellow ground color overlaid with a series of black or dark brown saddles, blotches, spots and streaks.

Distribution and habitat
The range of the yellow anaconda encompasses the drainage of the Paraguay River and its tributaries, from the Pantanal region in Bolivia, Paraguay, and western Brazil to northeastern Argentina and northern Uruguay. 

It prefers mostly aquatic habitats, including swamps, marshes, and brush-covered banks of slow-moving rivers and streams. The species appears to have been introduced in Florida, although it is unknown whether the small population (thought to derive from escaped pets) is reproductive.

Ecology
The yellow anaconda forages predominantly in shallow water in wetland habitats. Most predation occurs from June to November, when flooding has somewhat subsided and wading birds are the most common prey. Observations and analysis of gut and waste contents from regularly flooded areas in the Pantanal region of southwestern Brazil indicate that they are generalist feeders that employ both ambush predation and wide-foraging strategies.

Their prey consists nearly exclusively of aquatic or semi-aquatic species, including a wide variety of mammals, birds, reptiles, amphibians, fish and eggs. Larger specimens can prey upon larger animals, such as brocket deer, capybaras or peccaries. The prey-to-predator weight ratio is often much higher than for other types of Boidae. Cannibalism has been observed in this species, though it is not clear how often this occurs.

The yellow anaconda has few predators. Juveniles and the occasional adult may be taken by caimans, larger anacondas, jaguars, cougars, some canids such as the crab-eating fox, mustelids, and raptors. The species is also hunted by humans for its skin.

Interactions with humans

In captivity the species has a reputation for being unpredictable and somewhat dangerous to humans. In the United States, the import, transportation and sale of the species across state lines were banned in 2012 to try to prevent the yellow anaconda from becoming an invasive species in areas such as the Florida Everglades. The conservation status of the yellow anaconda has not been assessed by the IUCN.

References

External links

 

Eunectes
Snakes of South America
Reptiles of Argentina
Reptiles of Bolivia
Reptiles of Brazil
Reptiles of Paraguay
Reptiles described in 1862
Taxa named by Edward Drinker Cope